Yves Madjilom (born 1 April 1988) is a Chadian professional football player. He has made three appearances for the Chad national football team.

See also
 List of Chad international footballers

References

External links
 

1988 births
Living people
Chadian footballers
Chad international footballers
People from Sarh
Association football defenders
Association football midfielders